The Welsh Language Act 1993,  is an Act of the Parliament of the United Kingdom, which put the Welsh language on an equal footing with the English language in Wales.

Background 
The Laws in Wales Acts 1535–1542 had made English the only language of public administration in Wales. The Welsh Courts Act 1942 removed any doubt about the right to use Welsh in courts providing that the Welsh speaker was under a disadvantage in having to speak English, but this was very narrowly defined by subsequent case law. The Welsh Language Act 1967, overturned these decisions and gave rise to the concept of 'equal validity' between the Welsh and English languages. As a result, Governmental Departments began preparing documents in Welsh, and following a campaign of destroying or vandalising unilingual English road signs by members of Cymdeithas yr Iaith Gymraeg (The Welsh Language Society), local councils were allowed to provide many bilingual signs in Wales.

Act 
The Welsh Language Act 1993 established that 'in the course of public business and the administration of justice, so far as is reasonably practicable, the Welsh and English languages are to be treated on the basis of equality.'

The Act achieved three things:

 setting up the Welsh Language Board, answerable to the Secretary of State for Wales, with the duty of promoting the use of Welsh and ensuring compliance with the other provisions.
 giving Welsh speakers the right to speak Welsh in court proceedings.
 obliging all organisations in the public sector providing services to the public in Wales to treat Welsh and English on an equal basis.

The powers given to the Secretary of State for Wales under this Act were later devolved to the National Assembly for Wales. Delegated or secondary legislation has been made under this Act by the Secretary of State, and subsequently the National Assembly requiring more public bodies, such as the Welsh Language Board, to prepare what are known as Welsh Language Schemes which show their commitment to the 'equality of treatment' principle.

See also

Wales 

 Welsh Courts Act 1942
 Welsh Language Act 1967
National Assembly for Wales (Official Languages) Act 2012
Welsh Language (Wales) Measure 2011

Other 
Irish Language Act (Northern Ireland)
Gaelic Language (Scotland) Act 2005
Official Languages Act 2003 (Republic of Ireland)

References

External links
 
 Full text of the Welsh Language Act 1993
 Campaign for a New Welsh Language Act Archived 26 September 2011

United Kingdom Acts of Parliament 1993
1993
1993
Acts of the Parliament of the United Kingdom concerning Wales
Language policy in the United Kingdom